Blake Percival was the Director of Fieldwork Services, Western Pennsylvania,(WPA), for USIS.  He became a whistleblower in July 2011, when he filed a qui tam suit saying he was fired from USIS, for not ordering his subordinates to submit cases to the U.S. Government for payment, that had not been completed.  He had worked for USIS from January 2001 to June 2011.  In his suit he stated he had been fired after he refused to order his employees to continue an elaborate fraud known as dumping.  The suit was filed under seal in U.S. District Court in Montgomery, Alabama.  His allegations were investigated by the U.S. Department of Justice (DOJ) and in October 2013 the DOJ joined Percival’s suit and removed the seal.  The case, United States of America ex rel. Blake Percival v. U.S. Investigations Services, Civil Action No. 11-CV-527-WKW, was filed in U.S. District Court, Middle District of Alabama (Northern Division).  On January 22, 2014 the DOJ filed their formal complaint against USIS.  In their filing the DOJ stated that USIS committed fraud on at least 665,000 background investigations.  This case was moved to Washington, D.C. on April 25, 2014.  The case was settled on August 19. 2015 when USIS agreed to forgo claims to more than $30,000,000 it was owed by the U.S. Government.  On December 18, 2015 the Department of Justice awarded Percival 20%, just over $6,000,000, of the money recovered from USIS.

Education
Percival graduated from Bluefield State College in January 2000 with a Regeants Bachelor of Arts Degree.
He graduated from the West Virginia State Police Academy in April 1994 as part of the 86th Basic Class, which certified him as a Police Officer in West Virginia.
He graduated from the Montgomery Police Academy’s lateral training class in 1998, which certified him as a Police Officer in Alabama.
In 2008 he was licensed as a private investigator by the State of Minnesota Board of Private Detective and Protective Agent Services.
In April 2013 he was certified in Alabama as a Magistrate by the Alabama Judicial College.

Early career
From February 1986 to March 1992 Percival served in the U.S. Army.  While in the Army he worked as a Material Control Accounting Specialist for 4 years and as a Military Police Officer for 2 years.  He was assigned at Fort Ord, California, Fort Rucker, Alabama, and Fuerth, Germany.  In March 1992 he was honorably discharged at the rank of Sergeant.
From 1994 to 2001, Percival worked as a Police Officer. He held Police Officer positions in West Virginia and Alabama.  In West Virginia he worked at Beckley Police Department, and in Alabama he worked at Baptist Health Police Department, Auburn University at Montgomery, (A.U.M.) Police Department, and Wetumpka Police Department.  He also worked as a Bailiff at the City of Montgomery Alabama Municipal Court.

USIS
In 2001 Percival began working for U.S. Investigations Services which was later renamed USIS.  From 2001 to 2003 he was an Investigator conducting background investigations for the United States Office of Personnel Management, (OPM).  In 2003 he was promoted to District Manager and managed Investigators in the Fayetteville, NC area.  In 2005 he was reassigned as a Team Leader for Investigators in the Montgomery, AL area.  In 2007 he was promoted to District Manager of the Minneapolis District.  In January 2011 he was promoted to Director of Fieldwork Services, Western Pennsylvania.  He was fired from USIS in June 2011.

After USIS
From September 2011 to October 2013 Percival worked for CACI as an Investigator conducting background investigations for the United States Office of Personnel Management, (OPM).  From April 2012 to August 2015 he worked as a Magistrate at the City of Montgomery Alabama’s Municipal Court.  After his whistleblower case settled, he became a public speaker on the topics of Morals, and Ethics.  In April 2017 he became a member of the Washington, D.C. based law firm ProtectUS Law, which is a law firm specializing in whistleblower cases. Percival's book Holding on to Integrity and Paying the Price: A Whistleblower's Story was published January 6, 2020.

See also
List of whistleblowers

References

External links
/ Press Release from the US Attorney's Office, Middle District of Alabama, October 31, 2013
/ Press Release from The United States Department of Justice, October 30, 2013 
/ idRADAR, USIS Reportedly "Flushed" Background Checks To Boost Profits, Workflow
/ U.S. House of Representatives, 113th Congress, Committee on Oversight and Government Reform, Democratic Staff report on, The Role of USIS and Allegations of Systematic Fraud
/ Minnesota Association of Private Investigators listing for Blake Percival
/ 2009 list of Minnesota Licensed Private Investigators on docstoc.com 

Bluefield State College alumni
Living people
Place of birth missing (living people)
People from Montgomery, Alabama
People from Wetumpka, Alabama
American whistleblowers
People from Panama City, Florida
Year of birth missing (living people)